The Hum Honorary Lifetime Achievement Award is given by the board of directors of the Hum Television Network and Entertainment Channel (HTNEC) to the starlets of Pakistani television, film and media personalities in order to recognize and acknowledge their lifetime work and achievements within the media industry. Hum TV oversaw this award with the inception of its first ceremony, granting the award by Hum directors to work of exceptional achievement. All the categorized and organized special awards are awarded annually during the Hum Awards ceremony.

Recipients

Following is the listing of the recipients of Hum Honorary Lifetime Achievement Award:

2010s

Note: The † symbol indicates a posthumous award.

References

External links 
Official websites
 Hum Awards official website
Other resources
 

Hum Award winners
Hum Awards
Lifetime achievement awards